The Great Table was a large pink diamond that had been studded in the throne of the Mughal emperor Shah Jahan. It has been described in the book of the French jeweller Jean-Baptiste Tavernier in 1642, who gave it its name ("Diamanta Grande Table").

The diamond was plundered by Nader Shah during his invasion of India in 1739 and disappeared after his assassination.

In 1965, a Canadian team from the Royal Ontario Museum conducting research on the Iranian Crown Jewels concluded that the larger Daria-i-Noor and the smaller Noor-ul-Ain  may well have been part of the Great Table.

See also
 Daria-i-Noor
 Golconda Diamonds
 Koh-i-Noor diamond
 Noor-ul-Ain
 List of diamonds
 List of largest rough diamonds

References 

 A. Malecka, "The Mystery of the Nur al-Ayn Diamond", Gems & Jewellery: The Gemmological Association of Great Britain, volume 23 (7), August/September 2014, pp. 20-22  https://issuu.com/jeweller/docs/jeweller_g_j__sept_2014_/58
 A. Malecka, "Darya-ye Nur: History and Myth of a Crown Jewel of Iran", Iranian Studies vol. 51 (2018), https://dx.doi.org/10.1080/00210862.2017.1362952

External links 
 Great Table , By Scott Sucher, Museum Diamonds

Diamonds originating in India
Jewels of the Mughal Empire
Pink diamonds
Golconda diamonds